Francisco Segura Gómez (born April 7, 1972) is a Spanish professional basketball coach. Currently, he is the head coach of Hereda San Pablo Burgos of the LEB Oro.

Club career

Ionikos
In August 2021, Curro Segura signed a contract with Greek Basket League club Ionikos Nikaias.

AEK Athens
In March 2022, Segura moved to fellow Greek Basket League club AEK Athens for the rest of the season. On July 4 of the same year, Segura parted ways with AEK.

Titles and achievements

 2004–2005 : Liga Española de Baloncesto and Copa Princesa de Asturias runner-up. 
 2007–2008 : Liga Española de Baloncesto.
 2008 : Supercopa de España de Baloncesto runner-up.
 2018–2019: Liga Española de Baloncesto.
 2019: Copa Princesa de Asturias.

References

External links
Curro Segura at abc.com
Curro Segura at muevetebasket.es
Curro Segura at twitter.com

1972 births
Living people
AEK B.C. coaches
Ionikos Nikaias B.C. coaches
Spanish basketball coaches
Sportspeople from Granada